The 1818 Connecticut gubernatorial election was held on April 9, 1818. Incumbent governor and Toleration Party candidate Oliver Wolcott Jr. was re-elected, defeating congressman and Federalist Party candidate Timothy Pitkin with 86.32% of the vote.

General election

Candidates
Major candidates

Oliver Wolcott Jr., Toleration
Timothy Pitkin, Federalist

Results

References

1818
Connecticut
Gubernatorial